Pseudocholinesterase deficiency is an autosomal recessive inherited blood plasma enzyme abnormality in which the body's production of butyrylcholinesterase (BCHE; pseudocholinesterase aka PCE) is impaired.  People who have this abnormality may be sensitive to certain anesthetic drugs, including the muscle relaxants succinylcholine and mivacurium as well as other ester local anesthetics.

Signs and symptoms
The effects are varied depending on the particular drug given. When anesthetists administer standard doses of these anesthetic drugs to a person with pseudocholinesterase deficiency, the patient experiences prolonged paralysis of the respiratory muscles, requiring an extended period of time during which the patient must be mechanically ventilated. Eventually the muscle-paralyzing effects of these drugs will wear off despite the deficiency of the pseudocholinesterase enzyme. If the patient is maintained on a mechanical respirator until normal breathing function returns, there is little risk of harm to the patient.

However, because it is rare in the general population, it is sometimes overlooked when a patient does not wake-up after surgery. If this happens, there are two major complications that can arise. First, the patient may lie awake and paralyzed, while medical providers try to determine the cause of the patient's unresponsiveness. Second, the breathing tube may be removed before the patient is strong enough to breathe properly, potentially causing respiratory arrest.

This enzyme abnormality is a benign condition unless a person with pseudocholinesterase deficiency is exposed to the offending pharmacological agents.

Complications 
The main complication resulting from pseudocholinesterase deficiency is the possibility of respiratory failure secondary to succinylcholine or mivacurium-induced neuromuscular paralysis. Individuals with pseudocholinesterase deficiency also may be at increased risk of toxic reactions, including sudden cardiac death, associated with recreational use of the aromatic ester cocaine.

Genetics
The body has two primary ways of metabolizing choline esters. This is via the common, neuronal "acetylcholinesterase" (ACHE) and the blood plasma carried "butyrylcholinesterase" (BCHE), described here. Several single nucleotide polymorphisms in the BCHE gene have been identified, such as the D98G missense SNP chr3:165830741 A->G (Asp to Gly at 98) rs1799807 present in 1% of the populace (e.g. dibucaine-resistant "atypical" enzyme at 41% of normal activity), and the A567T missense SNP chr3:165773492 G->A (Ala to Thr at 567) rs1803274 (common K-variant "Kalow" at -7% of normal activity). Many uncommon variants, with greater effects on enzyme activity, are known such as S1, F1, and F2 

Genes encoding cholinesterase 1 (CHE1) and CHE2 have been mapped to 3q26.1-q26.2. One gene is silent. Specifically there are sixteen possible genotypes, expressed as ten phenotypes, six of these phenotypes are associated with a marked reduction in the hydrolysis of succinylcholine. The plasma cholinesterase activity level is genetically determined by four alleles identified as silent (s), usual allele (u), dibucaine (d), or fluoride (f); also this allele can be absent (a).

The inherited defect is caused by either the presence of an atypical PCE or complete absence of the enzyme. Cholinesterases are enzymes that facilitate hydrolysis of the esters of choline. Acetylcholine, the most commonly encountered of these esters, is the mediator of the whole cholinergic system. Acetylcholine is immediately inactivated “in situ” by a specific acetylcholinesterase in the ganglia of the autonomic nervous system (preganglionic and postganglionic in the parasympathetic nervous system and almost exclusively preganglionic in the sympathetic nervous system), in the synapses of the central nervous system, and in the neuromuscular junctions. The affinity of PCE is lower for acetylcholine, but higher for other esters of choline, such as butyrylcholine, benzoylcholine, and succinylcholine, and for aromatic esters (e.g., procaine, chloroprocaine, tetracaine). Normal PCE is produced in the liver, has a plasma half-life of 8 to 12 days, and can be found in plasma, erythrocytes, glial tissue, liver, pancreas, and bowel. When succinylcholine is used for anesthesia, its high plasma concentration immediately after intravenous injection decreases rapidly in normal individuals because of the rapid action of plasma PCE. In case of an atypical PCE or complete absence of PCE, the effect of the injected succinylcholine can last for up to 10 hours.

Drug Reactions
These patients should notify others in their family who may be at risk for carrying one or more abnormal butyrylcholinesterase gene alleles.

Drugs to avoid:
 Succinylcholine, also known as suxamethonium, which is commonly given to paralyse skeletal muscles as part of a general anaesthetic for surgery. A dose that would paralyze the average individual for 5-10 mins can paralyze the enzyme-deficient individual for up to 8 hours. If this condition is recognized by the anesthesiologist early, then there is rarely a problem, as the patient can be kept intubated and sedated until the muscle relaxation resolves. If not identified, residual paralysis can cause serious complications due to weakness of the muscles of respiration after the patient's breathing support has been ceased.
 Mivacurium, like succinylcholine, is a muscle relaxant and will have prolonged action in those with butyrylcholinesterase deficiency.
 Pilocarpine (trade name Salagen) is used to treat dry mouth. As the name suggests, dry mouth is a medical condition that occurs when saliva production goes down. There are a variety of causes of dry mouth including side effect of various drugs.
 Butyrylcholine - this is rarely used to treat exposure to nerve agents, pesticides, toxins, etc.
 Drugs containing Huperzine A and Donepezil, which are used to slow the progression of Alzheimer's disease.
 Drugs containing Propionylcholine and Acetylcholine
 Parathion, an agricultural pesticide.
 Procaine, a local anaesthetic agent used before and during various surgical or dental procedures. Procaine causes loss of feeling in the skin and surrounding tissues.

Diagnosis
This inherited condition can be diagnosed with a blood test. If the total cholinesterase activity in the patient's blood is low, this may suggest an atypical form of the enzyme is present, putting the patient at risk of sensitivity to suxamethonium and related drugs. Inhibition studies may also be performed to give more information about potential risk. In some cases, genetic studies may be carried out to help identify the form of the enzyme that is present.

Prevention
Patients with known pseudocholinesterase deficiency may wear a medic-alert bracelet that will notify healthcare workers of increased risk from administration of succinylcholine, and use a non-depolarising neuromuscular blockade for general anesthesia, such as rocuronium.

Prognosis 
Prognosis for recovery following administration of succinylcholine is excellent when medical support includes close monitoring and respiratory support measures.

In nonmedical settings in which subjects with pseudocholinesterase deficiency are exposed to cocaine, sudden cardiac death can occur.

Frequency
For homozygosity, the incidence is approximately 1:2,000-4,000, whereas the incidence for heterozygosity increases to up to 1:500. The variant EaEa genotype, homozygous absent, is approximately 1:3200. The gene for the dibucaine-resistant atypical cholinesterase appears to be widely distributed. Among Caucasians, males are affected almost twice as often as females. The frequency for heterozygosity is low among black people, Japanese and non-Japanese Asians, South Americans, Australian Aboriginal peoples, and Arctic Inuit (in general). However, there are a few Inuit populations (e.g., Alaskan Inuit) with an unusually high gene frequency for PCE deficiency. A relatively high frequency also was reported among Jews from Iran and Iraq, Caucasians from North America, Great Britain, Portugal, Yugoslavia, and Greece.

Arya Vysyas
Multiple studies done both in and outside India have shown an increased prevalence of pseudocholinesterase deficiency amongst the Arya Vysya community. A study performed in the Indian State of Tamil Nadu in Coimbatore,  on 22 men and women from this community showed that 9 of them had pseudocholinesterase deficiency, which translates to a prevalence that is 4000-fold higher than that in European and American populations.

Persian Jews
Pseudocholinesterase deficiency (anesthesia sensitivity) is an autosomal recessive condition common within the Persian and Iraqi Jewish populations. Approximately one in 10 Persian Jews are known to have a mutation in the gene causing this disorder and thus one in 100 couples will both carry the mutant gene and each of their children will have a 25% chance of having two mutant genes, and thus be affected with this disorder. This means that one out of 400 Persian Jews is affected with this condition.

References

External links 

 Cholinesterase Test - Lab Tests Online

Anesthesia
Complications of surgical and medical care
Enzymes